Nanula galbina is a species of sea snail, a marine gastropod mollusk in the family Trochidae, the top snails

Description
The height of the species' shell attains 5.5 mm, its diameter 7 mm. The broadly perforate, translucent, glossy shell has a depressed-turbinate shape. Its colour is variable, either uniform buff, uniform white, or with brown spirals on a white ground. The 4½ whorls are rounded on the base, angled at the periphery, flattened above and impressed at the suture. The sculpture of the protoconch is smooth, the next whorl shows a couple of spiral keels, which by intercalation multiply in number, but decrease in relative importance as the whorls advance. The body whorl carries close fine spiral threads, of which every fourth or fifth predominates. The radials are confined to faint growth lines. The aperture is slightly descending, oblique, angled above, rounded below. The outer lip is simple. The columella is expanded, and a little reflected above. A substantial callus unites the lips. The deep umbilicus is narrow, spiral, externally funicular, exempt from the spiral sculpture.

Distribution
This marine species is endemic to Australia and occurs in the shallow subtidal zone and the continental shelf off South Australia, New South Wales and Tasmania.

References

Further reading 
 Hedley, C. & May, W.L. 1908. Mollusca from one hundred fathoms, seven miles of Cape Pillar, Tasmania. Records of the Australian Museum 7: 108–125, pls 22–25 [114, pl. 22, fig. 2]
 Cotton, B.C. 1959. South Australian Mollusca. Archaeogastropoda. Handbook of the Flora and Fauna of South Australia. Adelaide : South Australian Government Printer 449 pp
 Iredale, T. & McMichael, D.F. 1962. A reference list of the marine Mollusca of New South Wales. Memoirs of the Australian Museum 11: 1–109 
 Ludbrook, N.H. 1978. Quaternary molluscs of the western part of the Eucla Basin. Bulletin of the Geological Survey of Western Australia 125: 1–286
 Wilson, B. 1993. Australian Marine Shells. Prosobranch Gastropods. Kallaroo, Western Australia : Odyssey Publishing Vol. 1 408 pp

External links
 

galbina
Gastropods of Australia
Gastropods described in 1908